Mantova is the Italian name of the city called Mantua in English.

Mantova may also refer to:

 Province of Mantua (Provincia di Mantova), Italy
 Duchy of Mantua (Ducato di Mantova), a duchy subject to the Holy Roman Empire; annexed to the Cisalpine Republic c. 1797
 Mantova F.C., the football club based in Mantua/Mantova
 Mantova railway station
 104th Motorised Division Mantova, an Italian Army unit in World War II
 Mantova Mechanized Brigade, various Italian Army units, the last of which was disbanded in 1997 
 Mantova Division, an Italian Army unit to be formed in 2014